The Ahmedabad–Mumbai main line or the Mumbai–Ahmedabad main line is a railway route on the Western Railway section of Indian Railways. It is one of the busiest railway routes of the Indian Railways and is fully electrified. The Western line of the Mumbai Suburban Railway operates on the southern part of this route.

The Ahmedabad–Mumbai corridor passes through some major industrial cities such as Vadodara, Bharuch, Surat, Ankleshwar, Vapi, Dahanu Road and Palghar. There are commutes daily and regularly between these industrial clusters for business and work. This makes the Ahmedabad–Mumbai line one of the most productive and the most beneficial for the public.

Main lines Branch
Currently, the Ahmedabad–Mumbai mainline consists of some branch lines which are totally on broad gauge, these are:
1) Nadiad Junction–Modasa line with a length of 104 km. New Line From Modasa-Udaipur Is Working
2) Vadtal Swaminarayan–Kanjari Boriyavi Junction line with a length of 6 km.
3) Khambhat–Anand Junction line with a length of 53 km.
4) Kathana–Vasad Junction line with a length of 43 km.
5) Vadodara Junction–Chhota Udepur line with a length of 105 km.
5) Dahej–Bharuch Junction line with a length of 62 km.
6) Rajpipla–Ankleshwar Junction line with a length of 63 km.

History
 In 1855, Bombay, Baroda and Central India Railway Company (BB&CI) incorporated by Act of British Parliament on 2 July, BB&CI signs agreement with British East India Company on 21 Nov to construct a railway line from Surat to Baroda and Ahmedabad.
 In 1860, BB&CI first section from Ankleshwar to Utran inaugurated and Surat railway station was built and it was the first railway station in Asia which is having a platform on the first floor (above ground level).
 In 1862, Asia's first narrow-gauge line opened between Dabhoi and Miyagam (near Vadodara), and also BB&CI introduces the world's first double-decker coaches.
 On 20 January 1863, the first train is flagged off from Kalupur railway station in Ahmedabad to Surat.
 In 1864, BB&CI train reaches Mumbai, runs between Grant road to Valsad.
 In 1870, BBCI Railway runs direct trains between Ahmedabad and Bombay.
 In 1901, The Anand–Tarapur branch line was inaugurated by Petlad–Cambay Railway of BBCI. 
 In 1929, The Vadtal–Kanjari Boriyavi Branch line was inaugurated by Boriyavi–Vadtal Railway of BBCI.
 In 1917, The Ankleshwar–Rajpipla branch line was inaugurated by the Rajpipla State Railway of BBCI.
 In 1930, The Vasad–Kathana Branch line was inaugurated by Vasad–Katana Railway of BBCI.
 In 1987, commissioning of electrified trunk route of Delhi–Bombay via Western Railway.

Trains
The following trains serve this line:

Runs only on this route

Starts from Mumbai, Valsad, Surat and Ahmedabad 

 * Technical stops

Trains run through this route

Speed limits
Most of the Ahmedabad–Mumbai mainline is classified as 'A' class line where trains can run up to 160 km per hour but in certain sections speeds may be limited to 120–130  km per hour.

, the average speed of the trains on this line is 70-80 kmph.

References

5 ft 6 in gauge railways in India
Western Railway zone
Transport in Ahmedabad
Transport in Mumbai
Transport in Vadodara
Transport in Surat
Railway lines in Gujarat